The Mindanao Journal is published weekly since 1977 by the Mindanao Journal Publications with editorial and advertising office located at 2nd Floor, Methodist Mission Center Bldg., C.M. Recto St., Davao City, Philippines.

Newspapers published in Davao City
Weekly newspapers published in the Philippines
Companies based in Davao City
Publications established in 1977
1977 establishments in the Philippines